Cercomacra is a genus of passerine birds in the family Thamnophilidae.

The genus was erected by the English zoologist Philip Sclater in 1858. The type species was subsequently designated as the Rio de Janeiro antbird.

The genus contains seven species:
 Manu antbird (Cercomacra manu)
 Rio de Janeiro antbird (Cercomacra brasiliana)
 Grey antbird (Cercomacra cinerascens)
 Mato Grosso antbird (Cercomacra melanaria)
 Bananal antbird (Cercomacra ferdinandi)
 Jet antbird (Cercomacra nigricans)
 Rio Branco antbird (Cercomacra carbonaria)

The genus formerly included additional species but when a molecular phylogenetic study published in 2014 found that Cercomacra was polyphyletic the genus was split to create two monophyletic genera and six species were moved to the newly erected genus Cercomacroides.

References

 
Taxa named by Philip Sclater
Taxonomy articles created by Polbot